Portaferry Lake is located by East Pitcairn, New York. Fish species present in the lake are atlantic salmon, smallmouth bass, yellow perch, rainbow trout, white sucker, and black bullhead. There was a State-owned carry down launch on Route 3, 9 miles northeast of Harrisville, which still shows on the DEC map of the lake, but the waterbody is now privately owned since the retirement of the Boy Scout Camp in 2007.

References

Lakes of St. Lawrence County, New York
Lakes of New York (state)